James Arthur Burrow (born November 29, 1953), commonly known as Jimmy Burrow, is a former all-star defensive back in the Canadian Football League and the National Football League and retired college football coach. He is the father of Heisman Trophy winner and Cincinnati Bengals quarterback Joe Burrow.

Burrow played college football at the University of Nebraska–Lincoln. He was drafted by the Green Bay Packers in the eighth round of the 1976 NFL Draft and played that season with the team. Following his time with the Packers, he played in the Canadian Football League with the Montreal Alouettes, the Calgary Stampeders, and the Ottawa Rough Riders.

Burrow's last coaching position was as defensive coordinator for Ohio University from 2005 until his retirement after the 2018 season. At the time of his retirement, he had been one of the longest-tenured coordinators in Division I football. He was Associate Head Coach from 2017 until his retirement. For his efforts, Burrow was named Scout.com's 2009 MAC Defensive Coordinator of the Year.

Burrow previously coached at various positions for, respectively, Washington State, Iowa State, Ames High School, Nebraska, and North Dakota State. He timed his retirement from coaching to coincide with the final college football season of his son Joe Burrow, who played at LSU in 2019. The elder Burrow publicly acknowledged that his wish to attend all of his son's 2019 games played a role in his retirement decision.

References

1953 births
Living people
Sportspeople from Hampton, Virginia
Players of American football from Virginia
American football defensive backs
Nebraska Cornhuskers football players
Green Bay Packers players
Montreal Alouettes players
Calgary Stampeders players
Ottawa Rough Riders players
Coaches of American football from Virginia
Washington State Cougars football coaches
Iowa State Cyclones football coaches
High school football coaches in Iowa
Nebraska Cornhuskers football coaches
North Dakota State Bison football coaches
Ohio Bobcats football coaches
Amory High School alumni
People from Amory, Mississippi